Bucks County is a county in the Commonwealth of Pennsylvania. As of the 2020 census, the population was 646,538, making it the fourth-most populous county in Pennsylvania. Its county seat is Doylestown. The county is named after the English county of Buckinghamshire.

Bucks County is part of the northern boundary of the Philadelphia–Camden–Wilmington, PA–NJ–DE–MD Metropolitan Statistical Area, more commonly known as the Delaware Valley. The county borders Philadelphia, the nation's sixth-largest city, to its southwest and the U.S. state of New Jersey to its east.

History

Founding

Bucks County is one of the three original counties created by colonial proprietor William Penn in 1682.  Penn named the county after Buckinghamshire, the county in which he lived in England. He built a country estate, Pennsbury Manor, in Falls Township, Bucks County.

Some places in Bucks County were named after locations in Buckinghamshire, including Buckingham and Buckingham Township, named after the former county town of Buckinghamshire; Chalfont, named after Chalfont St Giles, the parish home of William Penn's first wife and the location of the Jordans Quaker Meeting House, where Penn is buried; Solebury Township, named after Soulbury, England; and Wycombe, named after the town of High Wycombe.

Bucks County was originally much larger than it is today. Northampton County was formed in 1752 from part of Bucks County, and Lehigh County was formed in 1812 from part of Northampton County.

American War of Independence

General George Washington and his troops camped in Bucks County as they prepared to cross the Delaware River to take Trenton, New Jersey, by surprise on the morning of December 26, 1776. Their successful attack on Britain's Hessian forces was a turning point in the American War of Independence. The town of Washington Crossing, Pennsylvania and Washington Crossing Historic Park were named to commemorate the event.

Geography

The southern third of the county between Philadelphia and Trenton, New Jersey, often called Lower Bucks, resides in the Atlantic Coastal Plain, and is flat and near sea level, and the county's most populated and industrialized area.

Bucks County shares a western border with Montgomery County, and also borders Philadelphia to the southwest, and Northampton and Lehigh Counties to the north. From north to south, it is linked to Warren, Hunterdon, Mercer and Burlington Counties in New Jersey by bridges.

Tohickon Creek and Neshaminy Creek are the largest tributaries of the Delaware in Bucks County. Tohickon Creek empties into the river at Point Pleasant and Neshaminy at Croydon (Bristol Township).

Adjacent counties
Lehigh County (northwest)
Northampton County (north)
Warren County, New Jersey (northeast)
Hunterdon County, New Jersey (northeast)
Mercer County, New Jersey (east)
Burlington County, New Jersey (southeast)
Philadelphia County (south)
Montgomery County (west)

Demographics

As of the 2010 census, there were 625,249 people. The population density was 1,034.7 people per square mile. The racial makeup of the county was 86.6% Non-Hispanic white, 3.9% Black or African American, 0.3% Native American, 4.1% Asian (2.1% Indian, 1.1% Chinese, 0.7% Korean, 0.5% Filipino, 0.3% Vietnamese, 0.1% Japanese, 0.4% other Asian) 0.1% Pacific Islander, 1.7% were of two or more races, and 1.5% were of other races. 4.4% of the population were Hispanic or Latino of any race.

As of the census of 2000, there were 218,725 households, and 160,981 families residing in the county.

There were 218,725 households, out of which 35.30% had children under the age of 18 living with them, 61.20% were married couples living together, 8.80% had a female householder with no husband present, and 26.40% were non-families. 21.50% of all households were made up of individuals, and 8.10% had someone living alone who was 65 years of age or older. The average household size was 2.69 and the average family size was 3.17.

In the county, the population was spread out, with 25.70% under the age of 18, 7.00% from 18 to 24, 30.70% from 25 to 44, 24.30% from 45 to 64, and 12.40% who were 65 years of age or older. The median age was 38 years. For every 100 females there were 96.30 males. For every 100 females age 18 and over, there were 93.40 males.

The median income for a household in the county was $59,727, and the median income for a family was $68,727. Males had a median income of $46,587 versus $31,984 for females. The per capita income for the county was $27,430. About 3.10% of families and 4.50% of the population were below the poverty line, including 4.80% of those under age 18 and 5.50% of those age 65 or over.

Population growth
The 2013 population estimate of Bucks County was 626,976. This ranked the county fourth in the state, well behind (more than 10%) the counties of Philadelphia with 1,553,165 (247% of Bucks), Allegheny with 1,231,527 (196%), Montgomery with 812,376 (130%), and well ahead of Delaware with 561,973 (89.6%).

Growth began in the early 1950s, when William Levitt chose Bucks County for his second "Levittown". Levitt bought hundreds of acres of woodlands and farmland, and constructed 17,000 homes and dozens of schools, parks, libraries, and shopping centers. By the time the project ended, the population of Levittown had swelled to almost 74,000 residents. At the time, only whites could buy homes. This rule however, was soon overturned. Other planned developments included Croydon and Fairless Hills. This rapid sprawl continued until the mid-1960s.

In the 1970s, a second growth spurt began. This time, developers took land in townships that were mostly untouched. These included Middletown Township, Lower Makefield Township, Northampton Township and Newtown Township. Tract housing, office complexes, shopping centers, and sprawling parking lots continued to move more and more towards Upper Bucks, swallowing horse farms, sprawling forests, and wetlands. At this time, the Oxford Valley Mall was constructed in Middletown, which would become the business nucleus of the county.

Growth has somewhat stabilized since the 1990s, with smaller increases and less development. However, the main reason for this is not a lack of population growth, but loss of land. Lower Bucks now lacks large parcels of land to develop. Smaller residential and commercial projects must now be constructed. However, redevelopment of existing building sites is now a leading coalition in Lower Bucks. Many areas along the Delaware River have surpluses of abandoned industry, so many municipalities have granted building rights to luxury housing developers. Also, as the regions that began the suburban boom in Bucks, such as Levittown, begin to reach their 50th anniversaries, many commercial strips and other neglected structures are being torn down to be replaced with new shopping plazas and commercial chains. Also, with rising property values, areas with older construction are undergoing a renaissance. At the same time, Central and Upper Bucks are still seeing rapid growth, with many municipalities doubling their populations.

2020 census

Economy

The boroughs of Bristol and Morrisville were prominent industrial centers along the Northeast Corridor during World War II. Suburban development accelerated in Lower Bucks in the 1950s with the opening of Levittown, Pennsylvania, the second such "Levittown" designed by William Levitt.

Among Bucks' largest employers in the twentieth century were U.S. Steel in Falls Township, and the Vulcanized Rubber & Plastics and Robertson Tile companies in Morrisville. Rohm and Haas continues to operate several chemical plants around Bristol.

Bucks is also experiencing rapid growth in biotechnology, along with neighboring Montgomery County. The Greater Philadelphia area consistently ranks in the top 10 geographic clusters for biotechnology and biopharma. It is projected by 2020 that one out of four people in Bucks County will work in biotechnology.

List of notable Bucks County businesses

Tourism

Another important asset of the county is tourism. The county's northern regions, colloquially referred to as Upper Bucks, are known for their natural scenery, farmland, colonial history, and proximity to major urban areas, including Philadelphia, New York City, Allentown, Reading, and Atlantic City, each of which is within a two-hour radius.

Bucks County is home to twelve covered bridges. Ten are still open to vehicular traffic.  Two other bridges, both located in parks, are open only to non-vehicular traffic.  All Bucks County bridges use the Town truss design.  The Schofield Ford Bridge, in Tyler State Park, was reconstructed in 1997 from the ground up after arsonists destroyed the original in 1991.

Popular attractions in Bucks County include the shops and studios of New Hope, Peddler's Village (in Lahaska), Washington Crossing Historic Park, New Hope Railroad, Bucks County River Country and Bucks County Playhouse Theater (in New Hope).  Rice's Market near Lahaska is a popular destination on Tuesday mornings. Quakertown Farmer's Market (locally called "Q-Mart") is a popular shopping destination on weekends.  The county seat of Doylestown has the trifecta of concrete structures built by Henry Chapman Mercer, including the Moravian Pottery and Tile Works, the Mercer Museum and Fonthill, Mercer's personal home.

Southern Bucks, colloquially referred to as Lower Bucks, is home to two important shopping malls, Neshaminy Mall, Oxford Valley Mall, and Sesame Place, a family theme park based on the Sesame Street television series. Also within Lower Bucks County is Parx Casino and Racing in Bensalem, a casino and thoroughbred horse racing track. The casino was built on the grounds of what was originally Philadelphia Park Racetrack. The complex includes the throughbred horse racing track, expansive casino, a dance club, numerous dining options, and the Xcite Center.

Education

Colleges and universities

Bucks County Community College
Delaware Valley University
Cairn University in Langhorne
Holy Family University in Newtown
La Salle University in Newtown
Strayer University in Trevose

Public school districts

Bensalem Township School District
Bristol Borough School District
Bristol Township School District
Centennial School District
Central Bucks School District
Council Rock School District
Morrisville Borough School District
Neshaminy School District
New Hope-Solebury School District
Palisades School District
Pennridge School District
Pennsbury School District
Quakertown Community School District
Souderton Area School District (also in Montgomery County)

The Bucks County public schools listed above are served by a regional educational service agency
called the Bucks County Intermediate Unit #22 located in the county seat of Doylestown.

Public charter schools
Bucks County Montessori Charter School
Center Student Learning Charter School 
School Lane Charter School

Private schools

27 Catholic grade schools (there are also the 27 parishes in Bucks County of the Archdiocese of Philadelphia)
Abrams Hebrew Academy (K–8)
Archbishop Wood Catholic High School
Calvary Christian School
Conwell-Egan Catholic High School
George School
Holy Family Regional Catholic School
Holy Ghost Preparatory School (9–12 for boys)
Newtown Friends School (PreK-8)
Plumstead Christian School
Quakertown Christian School
Solebury School
St. Katherine Drexel 
St. Michael the Archangel
The Pen Ryn School
Trevose Day School 
United Friends School Quakertown
Villa Joseph Marie High School (9–12 for girls)

Community, junior, and technical colleges

Bucks County Community College
Bucks County School of Beauty Culture
Bucks County Technical High School
Cairn University
CHI Institute
Delaware Valley University
Holy Family University
Middle Bucks Institute of Technology
Pennco Tech

Libraries 
The Bucks County Library System was founded in 1956 by a resolution of the Bucks County Commissioners. Their mission statement reads: "Within our libraries and outside our walls, Bucks County Free Library fosters meaningful library experiences for the residents of Bucks County. We welcome our community by providing enthusiastic and effective staff, inviting buildings, a virtual presence, current materials, dynamic programs, and innovative services."

The Bucks County Library System is made up of 7 branch libraries in the following townships:

 Bensalem
 Doylestown 
 Langhorne
 Levittown
 Perkasie
 Quakerstown
 Yardley-Makefield

Arts and culture

Fine and performing arts
Many artists and writers based in New York City have called Bucks County home, settling mainly in the small stretch between Doylestown and New Hope and along the Delaware River. Notable residents have included Margaret Mead, Pearl S. Buck, Oscar Hammerstein II, Stephen Sondheim, Charlie Parker, Moss Hart, George S. Kaufman, James Michener, Dorothy Parker, S. J. Perelman, Stan and Jan Berenstain, Daniel Garber, Alfred Bester, Annie Haslam, and Jean Toomer. Bucks County has been the home of writer/musician James McBride, writer Eric Knight, Academy Award-winning film composer Joe Renzetti, musician Gene Ween of Ween, painter Christopher Wajda, photographer Michael Barone, and furniture designer George Nakashima. James Gould Cozzens lived in Lambertville, New Jersey, just across the river from Bucks County, and used Doylestown as the model for the setting of two novels; he is considered a Bucks County artist. Allen Saalburg relocated to Bucks County in 1947, and named his press after the canal.

The county boasts many local theater companies, including the long-established and recently reopened Bucks County Playhouse in New Hope, Town and Country Players in Buckingham, ActorsNET in Morrisville, and the Bristol Riverside Theatre, a professional Equity theater in Bristol.  The Bucks County Symphony, founded in 1953, performs in Doylestown throughout the year and the Bucks County Gilbert & Sullivan Society, founded in 2009, performs a Gilbert & Sullivan operetta with full orchestra each June.

The Wild River Review, an online magazine that publishes in-depth reporting, works of literature, art, visual art, reviews, interviews, and columns by and about contemporary artists, photographers, and writers, is based out of Doylestown.

Literature
The seemingly autobiographical novel The Fires of Spring by James Michener takes place in and around Doylestown.

Popular culture
Alecia Moore, more commonly known as Pink, was born in Doylestown, as was motion picture writer and director Stefan Avalos. Three American Idol contestants live in Bucks County: Justin Guarini, who was born in Atlanta, but moved to Bucks County; Jordan White, who was born in Cranford, New Jersey and moved to Bucks County; and Anthony Fedorov, who was born in Ukraine and was from Trevose, in Lower Southampton Township. Singer/actress Irene Molloy and classical tenor David Gordon were born in Doylestown. Musician Asher Roth was born in Morrisville. The Tony Award-winning Broadway play Vanya and Sonia and Masha and Spike is set in the county. The main members of the rock band Ween are from New Hope.

Film
The 2012 film Safe, starring Jason Statham, was filmed at the Parx Casino and Racing in Bensalem Township.

The 2012 film The Discoverers was filmed in a variety of locations in Bucks County, including Croydon, Bristol, Newtown, New Hope, and Tyler State Park.

The 2010 NBC pilot episode for Outlaw was filmed in the Andalusia section of Bensalem Township.

Bucks County is mentioned multiple times on the 2010 Freeform TV series Pretty Little Liars.

The 2009 film Law Abiding Citizen, starring Gerard Butler and Jamie Foxx, was filmed partially in New Hope.

The county fair scene in the 2006 film Charlotte's Web was filmed at the Southampton Days Fair in Southampton.

M. Night Shyamalan's 2002 film Signs, starring Mel Gibson, was filmed and takes place in Bucks County. The town scenes were filmed on State Street in Newtown Borough, and the drugstore scene was filmed at Burns' Pharmacy on Pennsylvania Avenue in Morrisville. The house was built on farmland privately owned and leased to Delaware Valley College in Doylestown Township. A stage set for some interior shots was created in a warehouse on State Road in Bensalem Township. Shyamalan's film Lady in the Water was shot across the street from the Bloomsdale section of Bristol Township. In addition, Shyamalan's 2008 film, The Happening, was filmed in Upper Bucks County, including Plumsteadville.

Central Bucks High School West football team was followed during the 1999 season for the documentary The Last Game.

With the exception of the footage filmed in the New Jersey Pine Barrens, all of the 1998 film The Last Broadcast was shot in Bucks County.

A short scene from Stephen King's The Stand, published in 1978, is based in Pipersville.

The producer Fred Bauer, the director Steve Rash and composer Joseph Renzetti of The Buddy Holly Story, released in 1978, all live in Bucks County, where the film was conceived, and written by Bob Gittler.

One of Steven Spielberg's earliest films, Something Evil, released in 1972, is set in Bucks County.

The 1942 film George Washington Slept Here was set chiefly in Bucks County, although most of the filming took place in the studio.

Media
Local print publications include Bucks County Courier Times, The Intelligencer, The Advance of Bucks County, Bucks County Herald, Bucks County Town and Country Living, Radius Magazine, Yardley Voice, Morrisville Times, Newtown Gazette, Northampton Herald, Langhorne Ledger, Lower Southampton Spirit, New Hope News, Doylestown Observer, Warwick Journal, Fairless Focus. Online news publications are Levittown Now, Bucks County Beacon, NewtownPANow, Bucks Happening, New Hope Free Press. WBCB is a local radio news station.

Sports

Rugby league
The Bucks County Sharks rugby league team played in the AMNRL from 1997 to 2010 season. They returned to play in the AMNRL in 2011, until the league's fold in 2014, when they subsequently joined the USARL.

Little League
The county has a considerable history of producing Little League baseball contenders. Since its inception in 1947, four of the seven Pennsylvania teams to compete in the Little League World Series in Williamsport, Pennsylvania have come from Bucks County: Morrisville (1955), Levittown American (1960 and 1961), and Council Rock-Newtown (2005). Two of these squads, Morrisville and Levittown (1960), went on to win the World Series title. In 2007, Council Rock Northampton won the PA State championship, and lost in the finals of regionals.

PIAA
The county is a part of PIAA's District I, and has seen many schools capture multiple state titles.

American Legion baseball
In 1996, Yardley Western Post 317 won the American Legion National Championship.

Bristol Legion Post 382 recently won the 2011 American Legion State Championship.

Horse racing
Parx Casino and Racing, formerly Philadelphia Park Racetrack and Keystone Racetrack, was the former home of Triple Crown contender Smarty Jones, is in Bensalem.

Parks and recreation

Pennsylvania state parks

There are six Commonwealth-owned parks in Bucks County:

Five are owned and operated by the Pennsylvania Bureau of State Parks, part of the Pennsylvania Department of Conservation and Natural Resources (DCNR).
Delaware Canal State Park
Neshaminy State Park
Nockamixon State Park
Ralph Stover State Park
Tyler State Park
 Bucks County Parks and Recreation operates an 18-bed youth hostel in the Nockamixon State Park Weisel estate.  The hostel is part of Hostelling International USA.
Washington Crossing Historic Park, a  site operated by the Pennsylvania Historical and Museum Commission, is part of Washington's Crossing, a U.S. National Historic Landmark area. The park is headquartered in the village of Washington Crossing located in Upper Makefield Township. It marks the location of George Washington's crossing of the Delaware River during the American Revolutionary War.

County parks

Core Creek Park
Dark Hollow Park
Lake Towhee Park
Peace Valley Park
Playwicki Park
Ringing Rocks Park
Silver Lake Park
Tinicum Park
Tohickon Valley Park
 Bucks County Horse Park

Historic properties

 Moravian Pottery and Tile Works
 Stover-Myers Mill; Erwin Stover House
 Moland House an old stone farmhouse built around 1750 located in Warwick Township, and served as the headquarters for General George Washington during the American Revolutionary War from August 10, 1777 until August 23, 1777.
 Pennsbury Manor house and grounds, the American home of William Penn, founder and first Governor of Pennsylvania, administered by the Pennsylvania Historical and Museum Commission in association with The Pennsbury Society and are open to the public.

County recreation sites

 Frosty Hollow Tennis Center
 Core Creek Tennis Center
 Oxford Valley Golf Course
 Oxford Valley Pool
 Tohickon Valley Pool
 Weisel Hostel
 Peace Valley Boat Rental
 Core Creek Boat Rental

County nature centers
 Bucks County Audubon Society's Honey Hollow Environmental Education Center
 Churchville Nature Center
 Peace Valley Nature Center
 Silver Lake Nature Center
 Clark Nature Center

Transportation

Airports
 Public airports administered by the Bucks County Airport Authority
 Doylestown Airport
 Quakertown Airport, also a Civil Air Patrol facility
 Van Sant Airport and Park, formerly owned and administered by the Bucks County Department of Parks and Recreation
Private Airports
 Pennridge Airport, owned by Pennridge Development Ent. Inc but open to public use for general aviation
 Sterling Aviation Heliport, privately owned and public heliport and helicopter repair facility located in Croydon, PA next to Neshaminy State Park.

Philadelphia International Airport in Philadelphia and Delaware County is a nearby airport that has commercial airline service.

Public transportation
Amtrak's Northeast Corridor line runs through the southern portion of the county. Select daily Northeast Regional and Keystone Service trains in each direction stop at the Cornwells Heights station in Bensalem.
SEPTA
City Division and Suburban Division bus routes across Southeastern Bucks
Regional Rail's Lansdale/Doylestown, Trenton, Warminster and West Trenton lines 
TMA Bucks's Rushbus – only parts of South and Central Bucks County
Bucks County Transport or BCT – a paratransit and ridesharing service
Doylestown Dart provides public transportation around the Doylestown area.

Major highways

Politics and government

|}

As of November 7, 2022, there are 481,780 registered voters in Bucks County.
 Democratic: 204,167 (42.38%)
 Republican: 196,486 (40.78%)
 Independent: 58,030 (12.04%)
 Third Party: 23,097 (4.79%)

Like most of the Philadelphia suburbs, Bucks County was once a stronghold for the Republican Party. However, in recent years it has become more of a swing county, like Pennsylvania at large. In presidential elections, Bucks has been swept up in the overall Democratic trend that has swept the Philadelphia area, although the trend in Bucks has been less pronounced than in Delaware and Montgomery. It has gone Democratic in every presidential election since 1992.

Until recently, Republicans still held most local offices. However, after Democratic gains in the 2018 elections, Republicans hold all but four state house seats covering portions of the county, while the Democrats and Republicans hold two state senate seats each. The Democrats and Republicans each hold four of the row offices. As in most suburban Philadelphia counties, Republicans tend to be conservative on fiscal matters and moderate on social and cultural matters.

All four statewide winners (Barack Obama for President, Rob McCord for Treasurer, Jack Wagner for Auditor General, and Tom Corbett for Attorney General) carried Bucks in November 2008.  Earlier in 2008, Democrats took a plurality of registered voters. The GOP statewide candidates in the 2010 midterms, Tom Corbett for Governor and Pat Toomey for Senate, both won Bucks.

While concerns about gerrymandering are on the rise, the 1st District remains one of the few districts in the United States that is almost fully encompassed by a single county. In order to comply with population requirements, the Bucks County-dominated 1st Congressional district also includes slightly over 100,000 residents in the Hatboro-Horsham area of Montgomery County.

The executive government is run by a three-seat board of commissioners, one member of which serves as chairperson. Commissioners are elected through at-large voting and serve four-year terms. In cases of vacancy, a panel of county judges appoints members to fill seats. The current commissioners are Diane M. Ellis-Marseglia (D) (Chairwoman), Robert "Bob" J. Harvie Jr. (D) (Vice-Chairman), and Gene DiGirolamo (R). The current terms expire in January 2024.

In 2012, four county employees were sentenced for compensating public employees for political work.

In the 2016 elections, Democrats Hillary Clinton (President), Josh Shapiro (Attorney General), and Joe Torsella (State Treasurer) won Bucks County while Republicans Pat Toomey (U.S. Senate), Brian Fitzpatrick (U.S. Representative), and John Brown (Auditor General) won Bucks County in their respective races.

County commissioners
Diane M. Ellis-Marseglia, Chair, Democratic
Robert "Bob" J. Harvie Jr., Vice Chair, Democratic
Gene DiGirolamo, Republican

County row officers

Law enforcement 
The current Bucks County Sheriff is Frederick "Fred" A. Harran. Three members of the Sheriff's Office have died in the line of duty. One was shot and two others died in traffic accidents. The first, Sheriff Abram Kulp was murdered in February 1927.

State Senate

State House of Representatives

United States House of Representatives

United States Senate

Communities

Under Pennsylvania law, there are four types of incorporated municipalities: cities, boroughs, townships, and, in at most two cases, towns. The most populous borough in the county is Morrisville with 10,023 as of the 2000 census. The following boroughs and townships are located in Bucks County:

Boroughs

Bristol
Chalfont
Doylestown (county seat)
Dublin
Hulmeville
Ivyland
Langhorne
Langhorne Manor
Morrisville
New Britain
New Hope
Newtown
Penndel
Perkasie
Quakertown
Richlandtown
Riegelsville
Sellersville
Silverdale
Telford (lies partly in Montgomery County)
Trumbauersville
Tullytown
Yardley

Townships

Bedminster
Bensalem
Bridgeton
Bristol
Buckingham
Doylestown
Durham
East Rockhill
Falls
Haycock
Hilltown
Lower Makefield
Lower Southampton
Middletown
Milford
New Britain
Newtown
Nockamixon
Northampton
Plumstead
Richland
Solebury
Springfield
Tinicum
Upper Makefield
Upper Southampton
Warminster
Warrington
Warwick
West Rockhill
Wrightstown

Census-designated places
Census-designated places are geographical areas designated by the U.S. Census Bureau for the purposes of compiling demographic data. They are not actual jurisdictions under Pennsylvania law. Other unincorporated communities, such as villages, may be listed here as well.

Brittany Farms-The Highlands
Churchville
Cornwells Heights
Croydon
Eddington
Fairless Hills
Feasterville
Levittown
Milford Square
Newtown Grant
Plumsteadville
Richboro
Spinnerstown
Trevose
Village Shires
Warminster Heights
Woodbourne
Woodside

Unincorporated communities

Almont
Andalusia
Applebachsville
Aquetong
Argus
Bedminster
Blooming Glen
Brick Tavern
Bryn Gweled
Buckingham
Bucksville
California
Carversville
Center Bridge
Danboro
Dolington
Durham
Elephant
Erwinna
Eureka
Fallsington
Ferndale
 Finland
 Forest Grove
 Fountainville
 Furlong
 Gallows Hill
 Gardenville
 Geryville‡
 Hagersville
 Harriman
 Harrow
 Hartsville
 Highton
 Hillside Village
 Hilltop
 Hilltown
 Hinkletown
 Holicong
 Holland
 Hood
 Jamison
 Johnsville
 Kintnersville
 Kulps Corner
 Lahaska
 Line Lexington‡
 Lodi
 Loux Corner (Hilltown)
 Lumberville
 Maple Beach
 Mechanicsville
 Mount Pleasant
 Neshaminy Falls
 Newville
 Oakford
 Ottsville
 Oxford Valley
 Paletown
 Passer
 Penns Park
 Pineville
 Pipersville
 Pleasant Valley
 Point Pleasant
 Revere
 Rushland
 Shelly
 Solebury
 Southampton
 Springtown
 Strawntown
 Uhlerstown
 Unionville‡
 Upper Black Eddy
 Washington Crossing
 White Horse
 Wrightstown
 Wycombe
 Zionhill

‡This populated place also has portions in an adjacent county or counties

Historic communities
 Tohickon, located under modern Lake Nockamixon

Police agencies and services

Population ranking
The population ranking of the following table is based on the 2010 census of Bucks County.

† county seat

Climate

Piedmont Region

According to the Trewartha climate classification system, the Piedmont (United States) section of Bucks County, which is located roughly northwest of U.S. Route 1,  has a Temperate Continental Climate with hot and slightly humid summers, cold winters and year-around precipitation (Dcao). Dcao climates are characterized by at least one month having an average mean temperature ≤ , four to seven months with an average mean temperature ≥ , at least one month with an average mean temperature ≥  and no significant precipitation difference between seasons. According to the Köppen climate classification system, the climate is a hot-summer, wet all year, humid continental climate (Dfa). During the summer months in the Piedmont, episodes of extreme heat and humidity can occur with heat index values > . The average wettest month is July which corresponds with the annual peak in thunderstorm activity. During the winter months, episodes of extreme cold and wind can occur with wind chill values < . The average seasonal (Nov-Apr) snowfall total is between 26 and 36 inches (66 and 91 cm) depending on elevation and distance from the Atlantic Ocean. The average snowiest month is February which correlates with the annual peak in nor'easter activity. Some areas of the Piedmont farther south and along the river below New Hope are in hardiness zone 7a, as is the Atlantic Coastal Plain region of Bucks.

Atlantic Coastal Plain Region

According to the Trewartha climate classification system, the Atlantic coastal plain section of Bucks County, which is located roughly southeast of U.S. Route 1 has a Temperate Oceanic Climate with hot and slightly humid summers, cool winters and year-around precipitation (Doak). Doak climates are characterized by all months having an average mean temperature > , four to seven months with an average mean temperature ≥ , at least one month with an average mean temperature ≥  and no significant precipitation difference between seasons. According to the Köppen climate classification, this region has a humid subtropical climate (Cfa). During the summer months in the Atlantic Coastal Plain, episodes of extreme heat and humidity can occur with heat index values > . The average wettest month is July which corresponds with the annual peak in thunderstorm activity. During the winter months, episodes of extreme cold and wind can occur with wind chill values < . The average seasonal (Nov-Apr) snowfall total is between 24 and 26 inches (61 and 66 cm) depending on elevation and distance from the Atlantic Ocean. The average snowiest month is February which correlates with the annual peak in nor'easter activity.

Ecology

According to the A. W. Kuchler U.S. potential natural vegetation types, Bucks County, Pennsylvania would have a dominant vegetation type of Appalachian Oak (104) with a dominant vegetation form of Eastern Hardwood Forest (25).

Notable people

Josh Adams, free agent professional football player born in Warrington, Pennsylvania
 Charles Albright, (1830–1880), United States Congressman; born in Bucks County
 Lavoy Allen (1989–), NBA G player for the Northern Arizona Suns
 Stan and Jan Berenstain, writers and illustrators best known for creating the children's book series The Berenstain Bears
 Christy Altomare, Actress and singer-songwriter, best known for originating the role of Anya in the Broadway musical Anastasia
 Jacob Jennings Brown (1775 – 1828), Commanding General of the United States Army
 Pearl S. Buck (1892–1973), author and Nobel Prize for Literature recipient; lived near Dublin in Hilltown Twp.
 Sabrina Carpenter (1999–), actress in Girl Meets World
 Brandon Cottom (1992-), NFL player for the Seattle Seahawks; attended high school at Council Rock High School North
 Ulric Dahlgren (1842-1864), Union Army Colonel, unsuccessful raid on Richmond, Virginia started the Dahlgren Affair
Charles Dera (1978), Pornographic film actor and professional martial artist
Charles Ellet, Jr. (1810-1862), Civil Engineer and Union Army officer
 Mary Jane Fonder, Criminal convicted of killing a fellow church member
 William Edgar Geil, Minister
 Chad I Ginsburg, guitarist of CKY
 Justin Guarini, singer/actor, and contestant on American Idol
 Roy M. Gulick (1904 - 1976), Major General and Quartermaster of the Marine Corps
 Oscar Hammerstein II, Oscar and Tony Award-winning writer, theatrical producer, and (usually uncredited) theatre director of musicals
 Samuel Hartsel (1834–1918), Colorado ranching pioneer; born in Bucks County
 Annie Haslam (1947–), lead singer of the progressive rock group Renaissance (band)
 Michael Hurley, singer and guitarist
 Maureen Johnson (1973–), author of young adult fiction
 Patrick Kerney, former NFL defensive lineman; grew up in Newtown
 Richard Kind, actor, Spin City and Mad About You
 Eric Knight, creator of Lassie
 Michael Levin (1984–2006), American-born Israeli soldier who died in the 2006 Lebanon War
 Saige Martin, first openly LGBT person and first Latino person to serve on the Raleigh City Council
 James McBride, writer and musician whose compositions have been recorded by a variety of other musicians
 Matthew McGurk, United States Army Officer; talent manager; music producer
 Margaret Mead (1901–1978), anthropologist; raised near Doylestown 
 Henry Chapman Mercer (1856–1930), archaeologist, artifact collector, tile-maker, and designer of poured concrete structures; Doylestown resident
 James Michener (1907–1997), author; Pulitzer Prize for Fiction recipient; lived in Doylestown
 Matt Millen (1958-), former National Football League linebacker and executive; lives on a farm in Durham
 David Miscavige (1960– ), Leader of the Church of Scientology
 Jamie Moyer (1962– ), starting pitcher in Major League Baseball (Philadelphia Phillies); born in Sellersville
 Dorothy Parker, writer, best known for her wit, wisecracks, and sharp eye for 20th-century urban foibles 
 Rembrandt Peale (1778–1860), portrait painter and museum keeper
 S. J. Perelman, humorist, author, and screenwriter; best known for his humorous short pieces written over many years for The New Yorker
 Christina Perri (1986-), Singer/songwriter
 Pink (1979– ), singer; real name Alecia Moore; born in Doylestown
 Justin Pugh, former NFL offensive lineman; attended high school at Council Rock High School South in Council Rock School District
 Nancy Raabe (1954- ), Lutheran pastor, composer, author, classical music critic. Lives in Hilltop Twp, works in Hatfield.
 Leon Redbone, singer/songwriter and guitarist
 Joe Renzetti (1941– ), Academy Award-winning film composer; musical arranger of many hit records; session musician
 Allen Rosenberg (born 1931), rower and rowing coach
 Asher Roth, platinum-certified hip-hop artist
 Dean Sabatino, drummer for the punk band Dead Milkmen; Pennridge High School graduate 
 Liev Schrieber actor, titular protagonist of Ray Donovan; Paternal ancestral home.
 Bryan Scott, NFL free safety; Bucks County native; attended Central Bucks East High School
 Paul Simon, musician; owned a farm in Bucks County
 Steve Slaton, former NFL running back; from Levittown; attended Conwell-Egan Catholic High School in Fairless Hills 
 Andrew Jackson Smith (1815–1897), Union army general
 Hiram N. Smith (1817-1890), Wisconsin State Assemblyman
 Ezra Stone (1917–1994), actor and director
 Superheaven, alternative rock/grunge band formed in 2008 (formerly known as Daylight)
 Brianna Taylor, cast member of The Real World: Hollywood; born in Warwick, lives in Warminster
 Troy Vincent, former NFL cornerback; lives in Lower Makefield and attended Pennsbury High School
 Dean Ween, pseudonym for Mickey Melchiondo of the band Ween
 Gene Ween, pseudonym for Aaron Freeman of the band Ween
 Jordan White, singer/songwriter and lyricist, contestant on American Idol

Official seal
The traditional seal of Bucks County, Pennsylvania takes its design from the inspiration of the county's founder, William Penn. The center of the seal consists of a shield from the Penn family crest with a tree above and a flowering vine surrounding it in symmetric flanks. The seal has a gold-colored background and a green band denoting Penn as the county's first proprietor and governor. In 1683, Penn's council decreed that a tree and vine be incorporated into the emblem to signify the county's abundance of woods. The seal was used in its official capacity until the Revolutionary War. The county government has since used the official Pennsylvania state seal for official documents. Today, the Bucks County seal's use is largely ceremonial. It appears on county stationery and vehicles as a symbol of the county's heritage. The gold emblem is also the centerpiece of the official Bucks County flag, which has a blue background and gold trim.

See also
 National Register of Historic Places listings in Bucks County, Pennsylvania

References

External links

Bucks County Government official website
Visit Bucks County (official website of county's tourism promotion agency)

 
1682 establishments in Pennsylvania
Populated places established in 1682